Luleå SK is a Swedish football club located in Luleå.

Background
Luleå Sportklubb was founded on 22 October 1915 at Lundgrens café in Storgatan.

Since their foundation Luleå SK has participated mainly in the middle divisions of the Swedish football league system.  The club currently plays in Division 3 Norra Norrland which is the fifth tier of Swedish football. They play their home matches at the Hertsö IP in Luleå.

For many decades, right up to the first years of the 21st century, the club also had an active bandy department.

Luleå SK are affiliated to the Norrbottens Fotbollförbund. The club won the Midnattsolscupen (Midnight Sun Cup) in 2009.

Season to season

Attendances

In recent seasons Luleå SK have had the following average attendances:

Achievements
Midnattsolscupen:
Winners (1): 2009

Footnotes

External links
 Luleå SK – Official website

Sport in Luleå
Football clubs in Norrbotten County
Association football clubs established in 1915
Bandy clubs established in 1915
1915 establishments in Sweden